Rumyana Dobreva (born 8 April 1964) is a Bulgarian swimmer. She competed in the women's 4 × 100 metre freestyle relay at the 1980 Summer Olympics.

References

1964 births
Living people
Bulgarian female swimmers
Olympic swimmers of Bulgaria
Swimmers at the 1980 Summer Olympics
Place of birth missing (living people)
Bulgarian female freestyle swimmers